Chee is a Chinese surname. It may refer to the Min Nan/Hokkien pronunciation of the Chinese surname pronounced Xú (徐) in Mandarin. Notable people with the surname include:

徐
 Chee Kim Thong (1920–2001), Chinese martial artist
 Chee Soon Juan (born 1962), Singaporean politician
 Chee Hong Tat (born 1974), Singaporean politician

朱
 Jason Chee Weng Fai (born 1983), Singaporean para table tennis player

齐
 Pamelyn Chee, 21st century Singaporean actress

Chee
 Alexander Chee (born 1967), American writer
Benjamin Chee Chee (1944–1977), Canadian painter
 Chee Wan Hoe (born 1971), Malaysian footballer
 Karen Chee (born 1995), American comedian and essayist
Robert Chee (1937–1972), Navajo artist
 Traci Chee, (born 1985), American writer
 Chee Dodge (1860–1947), Navajo leader

Fictional characters
Jim Chee, Navajo Tribal Police detective in the novels of Tony Hillerman

See also
Chee (given name)